The Ranzow–Sander House is a historic building located in the West End of Davenport, Iowa, United States. It has been listed on the National Register of Historic Places since 1983.

History
Charles F. Ranzow built this house in 1881. He established his paint store downtown, Charles F. Ranzow and Sons. The building is a contributing property in the West Third Street Historic District. The store sold oils, glass, doors and the like.  In 1884 the house was sold to Julius Sander. He was employed in the hardware trade and opened his own store in 1890.

Architecture
This Vernacular Eastlake cottage shows elements of the Queen Anne and Gothic Revival styles. It is a 1½-story house features an irregular plan, a steeply pitched roof, and bits of gable-end decorations. There are also decorative details across the top of the porch. Also noteworthy are the textured wall surfaces and the paneled vergeboards.

References

Houses completed in 1881
Vernacular architecture in Iowa
Queen Anne architecture in Iowa
Houses in Davenport, Iowa
Houses on the National Register of Historic Places in Iowa
National Register of Historic Places in Davenport, Iowa
1881 establishments in Iowa